The Contax RTS (1975) was a premium quality slr camera produced by Yashica under licence from Carl Zeiss who produced all the very high quality optics. The first RTS (short for "Real Time System") was designed by Prof. Dr. Katsuiko Sugaya, styled by the Porsche Design studio, and manufactured by Yashica as Top Secret Project 130.

The RTS was followed by the RTS II in 1982, which added TTL flash metering and a titanium shutter. In 1983 Yashica was acquired by Kyocera, and in 1990 the RTS III added a Kyocera-designed ceramic vacuum film pressure plate.

External Links :

- Contax RTS on camdex.fr

Yashica SLR cameras